A User interface stylesheet language is a stylesheet language which is meant to be applied to graphical computer user interfaces. They primarily act as subsidiary languages to style UI elements which are either programmed or marked-up (as in XML-based markup languages).

Examples 
 Cascading Style Sheets as used in Mozilla's XUL user interface
 Qt Style Sheets as used in KDE4
 Robert Staudinger's CSS theming for GTK+

References 

Stylesheet languages